Cham-e Murt may refer to:

Cham-e Murt, Afrineh
Cham-e Murt, Mamulan